Sisupalgarh or Sisupalagada is situated in Khurda District in Odisha, India and houses ruined fortifications. It used to be the capital of ancient Kalinga. It is identified with Kalinganagara of Kharavela and Tosali of Ashoka. It is one of the largest and best preserved early historic fortifications in India, with the earliest occupation both inside and outside the later site´s northern rampart around 7th to 6th centuries BCE.

Description
The remains of the ancient city Sisupalgarh has been discovered near Bhubaneswar, today, the capital of the Odisha state in India. Sisupalgarh was a nationally protected monument. On the basis of the architectural pattern and artefacts discovered during the early excavations, B.B. Lal concluded that this fort city flourished between 3rd century BC and 4th century AD. On the basis of the new findings, M.L. Smith and R. Mohanty claimed in 2001 that the fortified city flourished from around 5th century BC and probably lasted well after the 4th century. Thus, this defensive settlement originated prior to the Mauryan empire. The population of the city could have amounted to 20,000 to 25,000. Archaeologists have employed geophysical survey, systematic surface collections and selected excavations in the 4.8 km perimeter of the fortified area and studied individual houses and civic as well as domestic architecture to arrive at the figure. The significance of the population is clear when one bears in mind that the population of classical Athens was 30,000. However the historians also claim that it is too early to comment on the population of the city as yet only a part of the city has been excavated.

Excavations
The first excavations at the site were carried out by B.B. Lal in 1948. An American-Indian team took up work in 2001.
In 2005 ground penetrating radar revealed the probable position of the southern moat. Toward the centre of the fortress (Area D) the 19 column structure has been recorded three-dimensionally by means of a laser scanner. It is disturbed and incomplete. Two gates pierce each of the glacis of the quadrangular plan.
As at contemporary Jaugada, the plan tips 10° clockwise of north. With 1125 m x 1115 m (measured on the crest) Sisupalgarh is larger in surface than is Jaugada. Sisupalgarh's defences are the highest known of this period in India. The ancient settlement probably was not dense, but rather there was room inside the fortress to graze.

Excavations from 2005 to 2009 by M.L. Smith and R. Mohanty, reached bedrock or natural soil in some areas of the settlement, dating the earliest occupation around 7th to 6th centuries BCE in five different locations sampled, being the earliest C14 dating inside the city 804-669 BCE and outside 793-555 BCE, and the northern rampart was dated to 510-400 BCE.

Preservation of the remains
In Lal's day this site was wilderness. The major portion of the land that constitutes the ancient enclosed settlement somehow went from a protected monument into private possession. Since the site is nationally protected, it lies within the bailiwick of the Archaeological Survey of India.
In 2005 the Indo-German team documented considerable illegal building on this nationally protected site. Since 2002, yearly satellite images document the illegal house building especially in the north-western quarter which increased in tempo since 2010. Encroachment starts with the staking out of lots. Gradually, building materials is piled up. Foundation walls are laid. Then suddenly the house is erected as soon as possible before the officials can react. Since 2010 the developers have begun to build into the southern city wall and the officials seem to do nothing to counter this.

The well-known historian Karuna Sagar Behera has voiced serious concern over the preservation of material unearthed from the site and notes, "It is a shame that some gold coins and terracotta pottery found at the place during the first excavation in the late 1940s were subsequently lost." The loss of gold coins, is nothing in comparison to the wholesale development of the site by developers.

Gallery

Notes

References
Martin Brandtner, Kalinga und seine Hauptstadt in frühgeschichtlicher Zeit. Zum Bedeutungswandel einer ethnischen und geographischen Beziehung (Hamburg 2000)
B.B. Lal, Sisupalgarh 1948: An Early Historical Fort in Eastern India. Ancient India 5, 1949, 62-105
Dieter Schlingloff, Die altindische Stadt eine vergleichende Untersuchung (Mainz 1969)
M. Smith, Sisupalgarh Project (2001), http://www.sscnet.ucla.edu/ioa/smith/
Paul Yule, Early Historic Sites in Orissa (Delhi 2006) 
 http://archiv.ub.uni-heidelberg.de/savifadok/volltexte/2008/147/
 http://archiv.ub.uni-heidelberg.de/savifadok/frontdoor.php?source_opus=147&la=de/
 http://heidicon.ub.uni-heidelberg.de/EZDB-BildSuche?easydb=9ag4sm4rpao9ep96tq7bft69f0/
 http://archiv.ub.uni-heidelberg.de/savifadok/volltexte/2011/1793/

External links 

 http://archiv.ub.uni-heidelberg.de/savifadok/schriftenreihen_ebene2.php?sr_id=12&la=de

Forts in Odisha
Archaeological monuments in Odisha
Ancient Indian cities
Archaeological sites in Odisha
Tourist attractions in Bhubaneswar